Live at Masters of Rock is an official live video album by the Canadian heavy metal band Annihilator, recorded at the Masters of Rock Festival 2008 in Vizovice, Czech Republic, and released in 2009. The concert footage was released on a live DVD and a live CD was originally intended to be included as bonus tracks. The audio recordings, because of record label SPV's insolvency problems, were instead made into a live album. Halfway through the recording some cameras were turned off which resulted in clips from earlier songs having to be put in to fill the gaps.

Track listing

Personnel
Jeff Waters – guitar, vocals
Dave Padden – guitar, vocals
Dave Sheldon – bass
Ryan Ahoff – drums

References

2009 live albums
Annihilator (band) albums
SPV/Steamhammer live albums
2009 video albums
SPV/Steamhammer video albums
Live video albums
Live thrash metal albums